Shamsul Alam Dudu (born 10 November 1957) is a Bangladesh Awami League politician and the incumbent Member of Parliament from Joypurhat-1.

Early life
Dudu was born on 10 November 1957. He has a B.A., M.A., and law degree.

Career
Dudu was elected to Parliament on 5 January 2014 from Joypurhat-1 as a Bangladesh Awami League candidate. In June 2015, he oversaw 500 workers of the Bangladesh Nationalist Party and Jamaat-e-Islami Bangladesh joining the Awami League.

References

Living people
1957 births
Awami League politicians
10th Jatiya Sangsad members
11th Jatiya Sangsad members